Tenafly is a borough in Bergen County, in the U.S. state of New Jersey. As of the 2020 United States census, the borough's population was 15,409, an increase of 921 (+6.4%) from the 2010 census count of 14,488, which in turn reflected an increase of 682 (+4.9%) from the 13,806 counted in the 2000 census.) Tenafly is a suburb of New York City.

The first European settlers in Tenafly were Dutch immigrants, who began to populate the area during the late 17th century. The name "Tenafly" is derived from the early-modern Dutch phrase "Tiene Vly" or "Ten Swamps" which was given by Dutch settlers in 1688.<ref>Carpenter, Wm. H. "Two Words of Dutch Origin", Modern Language Notes', June 1886. Accessed February 12, 2010.</ref> Other derivations cite a Dutch-language connection to its location on a meadow.Gannett, Henry. The Origin of Certain Place Names in the United States, p. 298. United States Government Printing Office, 1905. Accessed October 11, 2015.

The borough has been one of the state's highest-income communities. Based on data from the American Community Survey for 2013–2017, Tenafly residents had a median household income of $153,381, ranked 13th in the state among municipalities with more than 10,000 residents, more than double the statewide median of $76,475.

Tenafly was incorporated as a borough on January 24, 1894, by an act of the New Jersey Legislature from portions of the now-defunct Palisades Township, based on the results of a referendum held the previous day.History, Borough of Tenafly. Accessed August 20, 2021. The borough was the first formed during the "Boroughitis" phenomenon then sweeping through Bergen County, in which 26 boroughs were formed in the county in 1894 alone. Portions of Palisades Township were acquired based on legislation approved on April 8, 1897.Honeyman, Abraham Van Doren. Index-analysis of the Statutes of New Jersey, 1896-1909: Together with References to All Acts, and Parts of Acts, in the 'General Statutes' and Pamphlet Laws Expressly Repealed: and the Statutory Crimes of New Jersey During the Same Period, p. 287. New Jersey Law Journal Publishing Company, 1910. Accessed October 11, 2015.

Geography

According to the United States Census Bureau, the borough had a total area of 5.16 square miles (13.38 km2), including 4.59 square miles (11.88 km2) of land and 0.58 square miles (1.50 km2) of water (11.20%).

The borough borders the municipalities of Alpine, Bergenfield, Cresskill, Englewood and Englewood Cliffs in Bergen County; and The Bronx in New York City across the Hudson River.Bergen County Map of Municipalities, Bergen County, New Jersey. Accessed March 15, 2020.

Tenafly's street plan and overall development were largely determined by its hills and valleys. The eastern part of the borough is referred to as the "East Hill" for its higher elevation in relation to the rest of the borough. There, the terrain rises dramatically to the east of the downtown area, terminating at the New Jersey Palisades, overlooking the Hudson River. Nearby is the Tenafly Nature Center, located at 313 Hudson Avenue.

Demographics

2010 census

The Census Bureau's 2006–2010 American Community Survey showed that (in 2010 inflation-adjusted dollars) median household income was $125,865 (with a margin of error of +/− $23,612) and the median family income was $140,100 (+/− $26,372). Males had a median income of $102,645 (+/− $7,373) versus $60,871 (+/− $9,308) for females. The per capita income for the borough was $60,557 (+/− $5,176). About 1.8% of families and 2.9% of the population were below the poverty line, including 1.4% of those under age 18 and 2.2% of those age 65 or over.

2000 census
As of the 2000 United States census there were 13,806 people, 4,774 households, and 3,866 families residing in the borough. The population density was 2,993.4 people per square mile (1,156.3/km2). There were 4,897 housing units at an average density of 1,061.8 per square mile (410.1/km2). The racial makeup of the borough was 76.79% White, 0.96% African American, 0.09% Native American, 19.08% Asian, 0.02% Pacific Islander, 1.40% from other races, and 1.67% from two or more races. Hispanic or Latino of any race were 4.65% of the population. 11.1% of residents reported that they were of Irish, 8.7% Russian, 8.6% Italian, 7.9% American, 7.8% German and 6.2% Polish ancestry according to Census 2000.DP-1: Profile of General Demographic Characteristics: 2000 - Census 2000 Summary File 1 (SF 1) 100-Percent Data for Tenafly borough, Bergen County, New Jersey , United States Census Bureau. Accessed July 30, 2012. Among residents, 64.0% spoke English at home, while 8.7% spoke Korean, 5.0% Spanish, 4.5% Chinese or Mandarin and 3.1% Hebrew.

There were 4,774 households, out of which 43.9% had children under the age of 18 living with them, 70.6% were married couples living together, 8.1% had a female householder with no husband present, and 19.0% were non-families. 16.8% of all households were made up of individuals, and 9.3% had someone living alone who was 65 years of age or older. The average household size was 2.86 and the average family size was 3.21.

In the borough the age distribution of the population shows 28.3% under the age of 18, 4.7% from 18 to 24, 25.4% from 25 to 44, 26.4% from 45 to 64, and 15.2% who were 65 years of age or older. The median age was 41 years. For every 100 females, there were 92.9 males. For every 100 females age 18 and over, there were 87.5 males.

2007 estimates state that the median income for a household in the borough was $109,887, and the median income for a family was $124,656. Males had a median income of $92,678 versus $61,990 for females. The per capita income for the borough was $62,230. About 2.3% of families and 3.1% of the population were below the poverty line, including 4.7% of those under age 18 and 3.3% of those age 65 or over.

Government

Local government
Tenafly is governed under a special charter granted by the New Jersey Legislature. This charter retains most aspects of the Borough form of government, with the addition of initiative, referendum, and recall features. The borough is one of 11 municipalities (of the 564) statewide that use a state-granted special charter. The governing body comprises a Mayor and a Borough Council comprising six council members, with all positions elected at-large on a partisan basis as part of the November general election. A Mayor is elected directly by the voters to a four-year term of office, and is eligible for re-election. The Borough Council comprises six members elected to serve three-year terms on a staggered basis, with two seats coming up for election each year in a three-year cycle. As the legislative body, the Borough Council adopts ordinances and resolutions, decides on appropriations, approves appointments made by the Mayor, determines policy, and establishes the functions of the various departments of the local government. Each Council member is chairperson of one of six standing committees. The Mayor presides over Council meetings, but only votes in case of a tie, and can cast a veto which can be overridden by a two-thirds vote of the Council.

, the Mayor of Tenafly is Democrat Mark Zinna, whose term ends on December 31, 2023. Members of the Tenafly Borough Council are Lauren M. Dayton (D, 2023), Jeffrey D. Grossman (D, 2023), Venugopal Menon (D, 2024), Adam Michaels (D, 2025), Julie O'Connor (D, 2024) and Daniel Park (D, 2025).2021 Municipal Data Sheet, Borough of Tenafly. Accessed May 1, 2022.Bergen County November 8, 2022 General Election Statement of Vote, Bergen County, New Jersey Clerk, updated November 21, 2022. Accessed January 1, 2023.Precinct Summary Results Report - Combined 2020 Bergen County General Election - November 3, 2020 Official Results, Bergen County, New Jersey, December 3, 2020. Accessed January 1, 2021.

In January 2020, the Borough Council appointed Julie O'Connor to fill the remainder of the term expiring in December 2021 that had been held by Mark Zinna until he stepped down earlier that month to take office as mayor.

In 2000, the local government of Tenafly sought to ban the erection of eruvs in their community. The eruv association filed a lawsuit in response to the borough's action. After six years of litigation in the federal courts, Tenafly settled by keeping the eruvs intact and paid $325,000 of the plaintiff's legal fees.

Federal, state, and county representation
Tenafly is located in the 5th Congressional District and is part of New Jersey's 37th state legislative district.2019 New Jersey Citizen's Guide to Government, New Jersey League of Women Voters. Accessed October 30, 2019. 

In redistricting following the 2010 census, the borough was in the 9th congressional district, which was in effect from 2013 to 2022.Salant, Jonathan D. "Big change, N.J.! 1.4M shifting to another congressional district. Use our tracker before voting.", NJ Advance Media for NJ.com, October 31, 2022. Accessed December 8, 2022. "But now more than 1.4 million residents are moving due to new district lines drawn by New Jersey’s independent redistricting commission to reflect population shifts under the 2020 census.... Redistricting will shift 106 municipalities — nearly one in five — into new congressional districts.... Moving from the 9th Congressional District, currently represented by Democratic Rep. Bill Pascrell Jr., to the 5th Congressional District, represented by Democratic Rep. Josh Gottheimer."

 

Politics
As of March 2011, there were a total of 8,709 registered voters in Tenafly, of whom 3,082 (35.4% vs. 31.7% countywide) were registered as Democrats, 1,445 (16.6% vs. 21.1%) were registered as Republicans and 4,181 (48.0% vs. 47.1%) were registered as Unaffiliated. There was one voter registered to another party. Among the borough's 2010 Census population, 60.1% (vs. 57.1% in Bergen County) were registered to vote, including 87.3% of those aged 18 and over (vs. 73.7% countywide).GCT-P7: Selected Age Groups: 2010 - State -- County Subdivision; 2010 Census Summary File 1 for New Jersey , United States Census Bureau. Accessed December 19, 2013.

In the 2012 presidential election, Democrat Barack Obama received 3,694 votes (58.8% vs. 54.8% countywide), ahead of Republican Mitt Romney with 2,489 votes (39.6% vs. 43.5%) and other candidates with 62 votes (1.0% vs. 0.9%), among the 6,281 ballots cast by the borough's 9,322 registered voters, for a turnout of 67.4% (vs. 70.4% in Bergen County).Number of Registered Voters and Ballots Cast November 6, 2012 General Election Results - Bergen County , New Jersey Department of State Division of Elections, March 15, 2013. Accessed December 19, 2013. In the 2008 presidential election, Democrat Barack Obama received 4,285 votes (63.3% vs. 53.9% countywide), ahead of Republican John McCain with 2,376 votes (35.1% vs. 44.5%) and other candidates with 54 votes (0.8% vs. 0.8%), among the 6,773 ballots cast by the borough's 9,002 registered voters, for a turnout of 75.2% (vs. 76.8% in Bergen County).2008 General Election Results for Oradell , The Record. Accessed January 21, 2012. In the 2004 presidential election, Democrat John Kerry received 4,195 votes (61.3% vs. 51.7% countywide), ahead of Republican George W. Bush with 2,569 votes (37.5% vs. 47.2%) and other candidates with 53 votes (0.8% vs. 0.7%), among the 6,848 ballots cast by the borough's 8,871 registered voters, for a turnout of 77.2% (vs. 76.9% in the whole county).

In the 2013 gubernatorial election, Republican Chris Christie received 57.3% of the vote (2,046 cast), ahead of Democrat Barbara Buono with 42.2% (1,505 votes), and other candidates with 0.5% (18 votes), among the 3,667 ballots cast by the borough's 8,800 registered voters (98 ballots were spoiled), for a turnout of 41.7%. In the 2009 gubernatorial election, Democrat Jon Corzine received 2,454 ballots cast (55.8% vs. 48.0% countywide), ahead of Republican Chris Christie with 1,701 votes (38.7% vs. 45.8%), Independent Chris Daggett with 189 votes (4.3% vs. 4.7%) and other candidates with 17 votes (0.4% vs. 0.5%), among the 4,401 ballots cast by the borough's 8,782 registered voters, yielding a 50.1% turnout (vs. 50.0% in the county).

Education

The Tenafly Public Schools serve students from pre-kindergarten through twelfth grade. As of the 2020–21 school year, the district, comprised of six schools, had an enrollment of 3,582 students and 305.2 classroom teachers (on an FTE basis), for a student–teacher ratio of 11.7:1. Schools in the district (with 2020–21 enrollment data from the National Center for Education Statistics) are
Malcolm S. Mackay Elementary School with 344 students in grades K-5, 
Ralph S. Maugham Elementary School with 364 students in grades K-5, 
J. Spencer Smith Elementary School with 350 students in grades K-5, 
Walter Stillman Elementary School with 334 students in grades K-5, 
Tenafly Middle School with 889 students in grades 6-8 and 
Tenafly High School with 1,231 students in grades 9-12.New Jersey School Directory for the Tenafly Public Schools, New Jersey Department of Education. Accessed December 29, 2016. Students from Alpine attend Tenafly High School as part of a sending/receiving relationship.Alvarado, Monsy. "Alpine to keep sending students to Tenafly", The Record, April 4, 2003, backed up by the Internet Archive as of May 16, 2011. Accessed November 20, 2017. "Alpine - The borough's high school students will continue to attend Tenafly High School under a new contract approved by the Board of Education this week."

The United States Department of Education awarded Tenafly High School the National Blue Ribbon School Award of Excellence at a special assembly to the Tenafly High School community on September 20, 2005. Tenafly was the only high school in New Jersey and one of 38 public high schools in the U.S. to receive the 2005 Blue Ribbon School Award.

The school was the third-ranked public high school in New Jersey out of 328 schools statewide in New Jersey Monthly magazine's September 2012 cover story on the state's "Top Public High Schools", after also being ranked third in 2010 out of 322 schools listed. Schooldigger.com ranked the school as tied for 26th out of 376 public high schools statewide in its 2010 rankings (unchanged from the 2009 rank) which were based on the combined percentage of students classified as proficient or above proficient on the language arts literacy and mathematics components of the High School Proficiency Assessment (HSPA).

Tenafly High School has performed well in college acceptance and SAT scores. Most recent college acceptance and SAT scores.

Public school students from the borough, and all of Bergen County, are eligible to attend the secondary education programs offered by the Bergen County Technical Schools, which include the Bergen County Academies in Hackensack, and the Bergen Tech campus in Teterboro or Paramus. The district offers programs on a shared-time or full-time basis, with admission based on a selective application process and tuition covered by the student's home school district.Admissions, Bergen County Technical Schools. Accessed December 29, 2016.

Academy of Our Lady of Mount Carmel, which operates under the supervision of the Roman Catholic Archdiocese of Newark, was recognized in 2012 by the National Blue Ribbon Schools Program of the United States Department of Education, one of 15 private and public schools in the state to be honored that year.

Transportation

County Route 501, U.S. Route 9W and the Palisades Interstate Parkway all pass through Tenafly.

The Palisades Interstate Parkway runs above the Hudson River from Englewood Cliffs north towards Alpine. There are no exits on the parkway in Tenafly; the nearest interchanges are Exit 1 in Englewood Cliffs to the south, and Exit 2 in Alpine in the north.

U.S. Route 9W adjoins and runs parallel to the Palisades Interstate Parkway.

 Public transportation 
Local and express bus service to and from New York City is available via NJ Transit bus route 166 to and from the Port Authority Bus Terminal in Midtown Manhattan.Bergen County System Map, NJ Transit. Accessed September 14, 2016.

Rockland Coaches provides services to the Port Authority Bus Terminal on Route 14ET from Montvale, New Jersey, the 9/9A/9T/9TA from Stony Point, New York and the 20/20T routes from West Nyack, New York.Service operating from Tenafly, NJ to New York, NY, Rockland Coaches. Accessed December 19, 2013.

Saddle River Tours/Ameribus provides a rush hour service to the George Washington Bridge Bus Station on the 20/84 route.

From the mid-1850s until September 1966, Tenafly was served by rail along the Northern Branch, originally to Pavonia Terminal, and later to Hoboken Terminal. CSX now provides freight service along the line. The former Tenafly Station, currently a restaurant, was added to the National Register of Historic Places in 1979; it is one of four surviving stations on the Northern Branch.

The Northern Branch Corridor Project, a proposal by New Jersey Transit to extend the Hudson Bergen Light Rail for nine stops and  northward from its current terminus in North Bergen to two stations in Tenafly, the last of which would be a new terminus near the Cresskill town line, met with mixed reactions.Hall, Douglas E. "Still waiting for light rail", Bergen News, February 3, 2011, backed up by the Internet Archive as of July 10, 2011. Accessed April 19, 2016. Many residents and officials believed that the negative consequences for the borough in terms of traffic and noise outweighed the benefits.Noda, Stephanie. "Light rail report released; Tenafly preparing response", The Record, December 15, 2011. Accessed December 19, 2013. "The committee and the mayor brought in Mark Gordon, Tenafly's consultant on the rail project, to give the committee a sense of what is going on with it and to provide some guidance. The major concerns include traffic and noise." In November 2010, voters rejected the plan to re-establish a rail service to the town by a nearly 2–1 ratio in a non-binding referendum, with all of the borough council candidates opposing the restoration of commuter train service. There is continued resistance to New Jersey Transit's preferred alternative as described in the plan's December 2011 announcement. Despite local opposition, officials in Bergen County asked the North Jersey Transportation Planning Authority to support the proposal. In 2013, New Jersey Transit announced that the line would end in Englewood, after Tenafly officials estimated that as much as $8 million in commercial property valuation would be lost and residents raised strong objections.

Historic places
Historic locations in Tenafly include:
 Christie-Parsels House, 195 Jefferson Avenue.
 Cotswold Mansion, 1 Byrne Lane.
 Demarest-Lyle House, 91 West Clinton Avenue.
 Elizabeth Cady Stanton House, 135 Highwood Avenue, home of the women's rights activist from 1868 to 1887. Stanton unsuccessfully attempted to vote in the borough in 1880.
 Roelof Westervelt House,  81 Westervelt Avenue.
 Sickles-Melbourne House, 48 Knoll Road.
 Tenafly Railroad Station, 1 Piermont Road, a former railroad station that operated from the mid-1800s until 1966.
 Theodore Roosevelt Monument, Roosevelt Common, Riveredge Road.

Notable people

People who were born in, residents of, or otherwise associated with Tenafly include:

 Edie Adams (1927–2008), entertainer
 Emin Agalarov (born 1979), Azerbaijani-Russian singer and businessman, who writes and performs songs in English and Russian and has been popular in both Azerbaijan and Russia
 Dean Amadon (1912–2003), ornithologist and an authority on birds of prey
 Dave Anderson (1929–2018), sportswriter for The New York Times who won the 1981 Pulitzer Prize for distinguished commentary on sporting events
 Hiroaki Aoki (1938–2008), founder of Benihana Japanese restaurant chain and father of DJ Steve Aoki lived in Tenafly during his Powerboating years
 Mark Attanasio (born 1957), investment banker and owner of the Milwaukee Brewers
 Peter Balakian (born 1951), Pulitzer Prize-winning poet and author
 Jesse Barfield (born 1959), Toronto Blue Jays and New York Yankees outfielder, lived in Tenafly during part of his career as a Yankee
 Mike Becker (born 1943), contract bridge player and official
 Gregg Berhalter (born 1973), head coach of the United States men's national soccer teamGalarcep, Ives. "Injury replacement wasn't sure if he deserved to play", Herald News, June 20, 2006. "As he stood on the sideline watching the U.S. national team's gutsy effort in its 1-1 draw against Italy on Saturday, Gregg Berhalter cheered his teammates on and congratulated them as they laid on the field after the 90 brutal minutes.... The Tenafly native wasn't sure what to make of the news, which he received while on vacation at Disney World with his family."
 Yogi Berra (1925–2015), player and manager for the New York Yankees
 Edna Libby Beutenmüller (1872–1934), scientific illustrator notable for her work in publications including those published by the American Museum of Natural History
 William Beutenmuller (1864–1934), entomologist who was curator of entomology at the American Museum of Natural History
 Verona Burkhard (1910–2004), artist, known for her murals painted for the U.S. Treasury Department
 Albert Burstein (born 1922), former member of the New Jersey General Assembly who served as Majority Leader of the Assembly before being appointed to serve on the New Jersey Election Law Enforcement Commission
 Jonathan Carney, appointed concertmaster of the Baltimore Symphony Orchestra in 2002
 Orestes Cleveland (1829–1896), Mayor of Jersey City 1864–1867; 1886–1892, member of the U.S. House of Representatives from New Jersey's 5th congressional district from 1869–1871
 John S. Conway (1852–1925), artist and sculptor
 Herbert Dardik (1935–2020), vascular surgeon who served as the chief of vascular surgery at Englewood Hospital and Medical Center
 Hope Davis (born 1964), actressKennedy, Dana. "The New Season/Film: Up And Coming: Hope Davis; Lucky for Her, She Flunked the 'Nuprin' Audition", The New York Times, September 13, 1998. Accessed December 18, 2013. "Ms. Davis, who grew up in Tenafly, N.J., where she was the second of three daughters, has no explanation for her long, lean period other than to say, 'I just wasn't ready for success.'"
 Jimmy Dean (1928–2010), singer turned breakfast meat entrepreneur
 Clifford Demarest (1874–1946), organist and composer
 Tate Donovan (born 1963), actor
 Alex Dezen (born 1978), platinum-selling songwriter and producer
 Eric J (born 1975), Emmy and Grammy award winning music producer
 Jeannine Edwards (born 1964), former ESPN/ABC sportscaster focusing on college football, college basketball and horse racing
 Victor Farris (1910–1985), inventor and businessman who has been credited with invention of the paper milk carton
 Fat Joe (stage name of Joseph Antonio Cartagena, born 1970), rapper
 Siggy Flicker (born 1967), cast member on the seventh season of Bravo's reality television series The Real Housewives of New Jersey Danny Forster (born 1977), television host, film/television producer and director, best known as the host of the Science Channel series Build It Bigger Bill Foxen (1879–1937), pitcher who played in Major League Baseball from 1908 to 1911 for the Chicago Cubs and Philadelphia Phillies
 Reuven Frank (1920–2006), former NBC News president and pioneer of Vietnam War-era news coverage
 Ralph Fuller (1890–1963), cartoonist best known for his long running comic strip Oaky Doaks Eran Ganot (born ), head coach of the Hawaii Rainbow Warriors basketball team
 Richard A. Gardner (1931–2003), child psychiatrist who coined the term "Parental Alienation Syndrome"
 Alan Geisler (–2009), food chemist best known for creating the red onion sauce most often used as a condiment topping on hot dogs sold by street vendors in New York City
 Alexander Gemignani (born 1979), Broadway performerRohan, Virginia. "He brings it home in Miz", The Record, November 5, 2006. "Alexander Gemignani, the Tenafly native who stars in Broadway's new revival of "Les Misérables", knows that, at 27, he's "certainly on the young side" to be portraying Jean Valjean -- the tortured, tragic hero who did 19 years of hard labor in prison for stealing bread."
 Alexie Gilmore (born 1976), actress who starred in the short-lived television series New Amsterdam Leon Goldensohn (1911–1961), psychiatrist who monitored the mental health of the 21 Nazi defendants awaiting trial at Nuremberg in 1946
 Lesley Gore (1946–2015), singer
 Nakia Griffin-Stewart, American football tight end for the Kansas City Chiefs of the NFL
 Rusty Hamer (1947–1990), actor
 Big Bank Hank (born Henry Lee Jackson, 1957–2014), old school rapper and manager who was a member of The Sugarhill Gang, the first hip hop act to have a hit with the 1979 cross-over single "Rapper's Delight"
 Ed Harris (born 1950), actor. Grew up in the borough and attended Tenafly High School
 Jon-Erik Hexum (1957–1984), actor
 Jack Hobens (1880–1944), Scottish-American professional golfer who made the first ever U.S. Open hole-in-one at the 147-yard 10th hole in the second round of the 1907 U.S. Open
 Jay Huguley (born 1966), TV, film and theater actor, best known for starring as Whit Peyton in Brothers & Sisters John Huyler (1808–1870), represented  in the United States House of Representatives from 1857–1859
 Bill Hwang, hedge fund manager
 Ron Insana (born 1961), CNBC anchor and senior analyst
 Margaret Josephs (born 1967), fashion designer, entrepreneur and television lifestyle expert who is the owner, founder and designer of a lifestyle brand called the Macbeth Collection
 Irv Koons (1922–2017), graphic artist, industrial designer, and illustrator who was one of the leading consumer package designers of the 20th century
 Shlomit Levi (born 1983), Yemeni-Israeli singer who is a former touring member of the folk metal group Orphaned Land
 Ross Levinsohn (born ), interim CEO of Yahoo!
 Sarah Lewitinn (born 1980), alias Ultragrrrl, author, Spin assistant editor, blogger, downtown socialiteSpitz, Marc. "Grrrl's Got Rhythm", Vanity Fair (magazine), November 2006. Accessed July 8, 2007. "An Orthodox Jew, Lewitinn recently abandoned a recording session on the West Coast to fly to her parents' home in Tenafly, New Jersey."
 Charles S. Lieber (1931–2009), clinical nutritionist who established that excess alcohol consumption can cause cirrhosis of the liver, even in subjects with an adequate diet
 Ignatius Lissner (1867–1948), French-born Catholic priest who was instrumental in developing the ministry of the Catholic Church in the United States to the African American population through the Society of African Missions
 Baby M (born 1986), subject of noted custody case between the egg donor/surrogate mother and the child's biological father
 Tino Martinez (born 1967), first baseman who played for the New York Yankees
 Don Mattingly (born 1961), New York YankeesThomas Jr., Robert McG.; and Martinez, Michael. "Sports World Specials; Picture Perfect", The New York Times, March 23, 1987. Accessed October 11, 2015. "Then they gathered, for his approval, a stack of other Mattingly-at-the-bat shots and sent them to his Tenafly, N.J., home, where he cast aside first this one (shoulder slightly askew), then that (weight not quite properly shifted), before finally deciding on just the right candidate from a batch of no fewer than 100. 'It was no big deal,' said baseball's best player."
 Gil McDougald (1928–2010), American League Rookie of the Year winner in 1951, who played his entire career with the New York Yankees, appearing in 53 World Series games
 Richard P. McCormick (1916–2006), historian and professor, who was president of the New Jersey Historical Society
 Lea Michele (born 1986), actress best known for starring in the Fox TV show Glee as Rachel Berry
 Edward Miguel (born 1974), Professor of Environmental and Resource Economics at the University of California, Berkeley
 Glenn Miller (1904–1944), bandleaderSimon, George Thomas. Glenn Miller and His Orchestra, p. 211. Da Capo Press, 1980. . Accessed October 11, 2015. "Finally they found a place they loved over in Tenafly – The Cotswold on Byrne Lane."
 Ray Morgan (1913–1975), radio and television announcer
 David Nelson (1936–2011), actor, director, and producer
 Don Nelson (1927–2013), screenwriter, film producer and jazz musician, best known for his work on the sitcom The Adventures of Ozzie and Harriet Ricky Nelson (1940–1985), actor, musician, and singer-songwriter, who from the age of eight, starred alongside his family in the radio and television series The Adventures of Ozzie and Harriet Josette Norris (born 1995), middle to long distance runner
 Frank C. Osmers Jr. (1907–1977), represented New Jersey's 9th congressional district from 1939–1943 and 1951–1965
 Barbara Pariente (born 1948), former Chief Justice of the Florida Supreme CourtPudlow, Jan. "Barbara J. Pariente, Chief Justice of the Florida Supreme Court", The Florida Bar Journal, October 2004 at Florida Supreme Court. Accessed October 11, 2015. "She worked at the snack shack at Tenafly High School, and Susanne Pariente remembers her older sister debated with their dad about politics."
 Carol Potter (born 1948), stage and television actress best known as Cindy Walsh on Beverly Hills, 90210 George Price (1901–1995), cartoonist best known for his work for The New Yorker Tom Rinaldi, reporter for ESPN and ABC
 Seth Roland (born 1957), former soccer player who has been coach of the Fairleigh Dickinson Knights men's soccer team.
 Adam Rothenberg (born 1975), stage and movie actor, Mad Money Steve Rothman, (born 1952), Congressman
 Peter Secchia (1937–2020), businessman who served as the United States Ambassador to Italy and San Marino from 1989 to 1993
 Gareb Shamus (born 1968), connectivist artist who works primarily as a painter
 David Shepard (1940–2017), film preservationist whose company, Film Preservation Associates, is responsible for many high-quality video versions of silent films
 Brandon Silverstein (born 1991), entrepreneur and entertainment industry executive
 Michael Sorvino (born 1977), actor and voice actor
 Mira Sorvino (born 1967), actress who won the Academy Award for Best Supporting Actress for her performance in Woody Allen's Mighty Aphrodite Paul Sorvino (born 1939), actor
 Elizabeth Cady Stanton (1815–1902), leading figure in the early women's rights movement
 William Lee Stoddart (1868–1940), architect noted for hotels of the pre-World War II era along the East Coast of the United States"Out of the Attic: From cutting edge to obsolete in a decade: Hotel George Mason", Alexandria Times, May 1, 2014. Accessed January 22, 2023. "William Lee Stoddart, who was born in Tenafly, N.J. in 1868, designed the hotel."
 Lori Stokes (born 1962), morning anchorwoman for WABC-TV
 George Tanham (1922–2003), international security expert who was an executive with the RAND Corporation
 Henry Taub (1927–2011), businessman and philanthropist who co-founded ADP
 Joe Taub (1929–2017), businessman who joined his brother Henry Taub and Frank Lautenberg in building the payroll company Automatic Data Processing and later was part of an investment group that acquired the New Jersey Nets
 Thomas D. Thacher (1881–1950), one-time Solicitor General of the United States
 Caren Turner (born 1957), infamous for her role in the "Tenafly Traffic Stop Incident" which forced her to resign from her career
 Trish Van Devere (born 1941), actress
 Huyler Westervelt (1869–1949), pitcher who had a 7–10 record in his single MLB season with the New York Giants
 Jacob Aaron Westervelt (1800–1879), shipbuilder in the mid-19th century and Mayor of New York City (1853–1855)
 Tracy Wolfson (born 1975), sportscaster for CBS Sports
 Sofie Zamchick (born 1994), folk-pop singer-songwriter and actress, best known as the voice of Linny the Guinea Pig on the animated children's television series, Wonder Pets Milan Zeleny (born 1942), economist

References

Bibliography

 Municipal Incorporations of the State of New Jersey (according to Counties)'' prepared by the Division of Local Government, Department of the Treasury (New Jersey); December 1, 1958.
 Clayton, W. Woodford; and Nelson, William. History of Bergen and Passaic Counties, New Jersey, with Biographical Sketches of Many of its Pioneers and Prominent Men., Philadelphia: Everts and Peck, 1882.
 Harvey, Cornelius Burnham (ed.), Genealogical History of Hudson and Bergen Counties, New Jersey. New York: New Jersey Genealogical Publishing Co., 1900.
 Rigney, Alice Renner; and Stefanowicz, Paul J. Images of America: Tenafly, Arcadia Publishing, 2009. .
 Van Valen, James M. History of Bergen County, New Jersey. New York: New Jersey Publishing and Engraving Co., 1900.
 Westervelt, Frances A. (Frances Augusta), 1858–1942, History of Bergen County, New Jersey, 1630–1923, Lewis Historical Publishing Company, 1923.

External links

 Tenafly official website

 
1894 establishments in New Jersey
Boroughs in Bergen County, New Jersey
Dutch-American culture in New Jersey
Populated places established in 1894
New Jersey populated places on the Hudson River
Special Charters in New Jersey